Dela may refer to:

People
 Dela, Count of Empúries (died c. 894), count of Empúries
 Dela (footballer) (born 1999), Adrián de la Fuente, Spanish footballer
 Dela Smith, headteacher at Beaumont Hill Technology College
 Dela Yampolsky (born 1988), Israeli-Nigerian football player

Places
 Dela, Ethiopia
 Dela, Iran
 Dela, Oklahoma
 Dela, Raebareli, Uttar Pradesh, India
 DeLaveaga Disc Golf Course, commonly known as "DeLa"

Other
 "Dela" (song), a song by Johnny Clegg & Savuka's from the 1989 album Cruel, Crazy Beautiful World

See also
 Dela Cruz (disambiguation)
 Dela Rosa (disambiguation)
 Dela-Oenale language
 mac Dela, an Irish surname
 
 Della (disambiguation)